The 2022 BAL Finals was the championship game of the 2022 BAL season, the second season of the Basketball Africa League (BAL). The final was played in the BK Arena in Kigali on 28 May 2022, between Angolan club Petro de Luanda and Tunisian club US Monastir.

US Monastir won the game after pulling away in the fourth quarter, winning its first BAL and its first African continental title. The game was attended by a sold-out crowd of 10,000.

Teams
In the following table, finals in the FIBA Africa Clubs Champions Cup are in small text.

Venue
On 9 December 2021, The BK Arena, then named the "Kigali Arena", was announced as the venue of the 2022 BAL Playoffs. This was the second consecutive final that was held at the arena.

Background

Petro de Luanda 

Petro de Luanda qualified as the champions of the 2020–21 season and brought back Brazilian coach José Neto for a second season. The core of its roster remained intact, with Anderson Correia and Yanick Moreira being signed as reinforcements on 15 March 2022.

Petro had its most successful season in history, as the team won the 2021–22 Angolan Basketball League with an unbeaten record of 33–0. On 11 May 2022, it captured its 15th national title after sweeping Interclube in the national finals. As the team also won the Angolan Cup and the Angolan Supercup, it captured its first national treble.

In the 2022 BAL Nile Conference, Petro ended in second place after losing only to Zamalek. On 8 May, American guard E. C. Matthews was added to the roster ahead of the playoffs. After defeating AS Salé in a re-match of last season's quarterfinal, Petro defeated FAP to reach its first-ever BAL final and its ninth African continental final.

US Monastir 

US Monastir qualified for its second straight BAL season after winning the 2020–21 Championnat National A title. In the offseason, the club lost its All-BAL star players Omar Abada and Makrem Ben Romdhane in the offseason as they signed in Saudi Arabia and Portugal respectively. The roster was strengthened with Solo Diabate and Michael Dixon, however, while Ater Majok re-signed.

In its domestic competitions, Monastir had another dominant season as it captured its fourth consecutive national title on 11 May 2022, having defeated Ezzahra Sports in the finals. Three days later, on 14 May, Monastir also won the Tunisian Cup to complete the double.

In the 2022 BAL Sahara Conference, Monastir finished second after a surprising loss against Rwandan club REG. Ahead of the playoffs, the team was strengthened with American guard Julius Coles Jr. In the quarterfinals, the team blew out Cape Town Tigers by a season-high 39 points difference. In the semifinals, the team defeated Zamalek to take revenge for the previous season's final loss.

Road to the finals

Game

Aftermath 
To honour their championship, US Monastir was received at the Carthage Palace by Tunisian President Kais Saied. The team was also congratulated online by former President Barack Obama of the United States.

References

May 2022 sports events in Africa
Final
Sport in Kigali